Quvenzhané Wallis (born August 28, 2003) is an American actress and author. In 2012, she starred as Hushpuppy in the drama film Beasts of the Southern Wild (2012), for which she was nominated for the Academy Award for Best Actress, becoming the youngest actress to be nominated in the category, as well as the first person born in the 21st century nominated for an Oscar, She starred as Annie Bennett in the 2014 adaptation of Annie, for which she received a Golden Globe nomination for Best Actress in a Motion Picture – Comedy or Musical.<ref>{{cite web |first=Amy |last=Nicholson |url=http://www.boxoffice.com/articles/2012-06-quvenzhan-conquers-hollywood-20-questions-for-the-8-year-old-star-of-beasts-of-the-southern-wild |title=Quvenzhané Conquers Hollywood: 20 Questions for the 8-year-old star of Beasts of the Southern Wild;) |date=June 29, 2012 |work=Boxoffice.com |access-date=2012-12-14 |url-status=dead |archive-url=https://web.archive.org/web/20130419015410/http://www.boxoffice.com/articles/2012-06-quvenzhan-conquers-hollywood-20-questions-for-the-8-year-old-star-of-beasts-of-the-southern-wild |archive-date=April 19, 2013 |df=mdy-all }}</ref>

In 2017, Wallis published two books, Shai & Emmie Star in Break an Egg! and A Night Out with Mama. She has published two more books: Shai & Emmie Star in Dancy Pants! and Shai & Emmie Star in To the Rescue!Early life
Wallis was born in Houma, Louisiana, to Qulyndreia Wallis (née Jackson), a teacher, and Venjie Wallis Sr., a truck driver. She has one sister, Qunyquekya, and two brothers, Vejon and Venjie Jr. Her name "Quvenzhané" combines the first syllables of her parents' first names in "Quven", and an alteration of the Swahili word jini meaning 'sprite' or 'fairy'.

Career
At age five, Wallis lied about her age to audition for Beasts of the Southern Wild (2012), which had a minimum tryout age of 6. She was chosen out of 4,000 to play Hushpuppy, an indomitable child prodigy and survivalist who lives with her dying father in the backwoods bayou squalor of Louisiana. Director Benh Zeitlin told The Daily Beast that when he auditioned Wallis, he immediately realized he had discovered what he was looking for, and changed the Beasts of the Southern Wild script to accommodate her strong-willed personality. Her reading prowess, loud screaming voice, and ability to burp on command impressed the director and won her the part. Zeitlin has stated that "it was just the feeling behind her eyes".

The film premiered at Sundance Film Festival in January 2012 to rave reviews, winning the Grand Jury Prize. In May 2012, Wallis flew to France for the premiere of the film at the 2012 Cannes Film Festival. Wallis's performance drew widespread acclaim and Zeitlin won the Caméra d'Or, the festival's award for best first feature film. On January 10, 2013, at age nine, Wallis was nominated for an Academy Award for Best Actress in a Leading Role. Wallis, who was 6 when she filmed Beasts of the Southern Wild, is the all-time youngest nominee for Best Actress and the third-youngest nominee in any category. Wallis is the first African-American child actor and the first person born in the 21st century to earn an Oscar nomination.

Wallis had a role in the film 12 Years a Slave (2013), and collaborated with the Sundance Film Festival  on a short film called Boneshaker. In 2014, she played the title character in Annie, the first African American to do so. For this, she was nominated for the Golden Globe Award for Best Actress in a Motion Picture – Comedy or Musical and received praise from most reviewers. In May 2014, Wallis became the first child celebrity to be named the face of a luxury brand when she was signed by Armani Junior, Giorgio Armani's fashion line for children and teens.

Wallis appeared in Beyoncé's 2016 music video for "All Night". In October 2017, she released two children's books: the friendship-centric Shai & Emmie Star in Break an Egg! and A Night Out With Mama, which is about her night at the Oscars with her mother. She published two more books, Shai & Emmie Star in To the Rescue! and Shai & Emmie Star in Dancy Pants!'', in 2018.

She became a member of the Actors Branch of the Academy of Motion Picture Arts and Sciences in 2018.

Filmography

Awards and nominations

See also
 List of oldest and youngest Academy Award winners and nominees – Youngest nominees for Best Actress in a Leading Role
List of actors with Academy Award nominations
List of accolades received by Beasts of the Southern Wild

References

External links

2003 births
21st-century American actresses
21st-century American women writers
Actresses from Louisiana
African-American actresses
American child actresses
American film actresses
American television actresses
American voice actresses
Living people
People from Houma, Louisiana
Writers from Louisiana
21st-century African-American women